Raquelia Rocks is a group of three adjacent rocks in eastern South Bay, Livingston Island in the South Shetland Islands, Antarctica formed by an offshoot of Atlantic Club Ridge halfway along the Zodiac boat route linking the Spanish Antarctic Base and the Bulgarian Antarctic Base on the island.  The area was visited by early 19th century sealers operating from nearby Johnsons Dock.

The feature's name appeared first on a 1998 Spanish chart.

Location

See also 
 Composite Antarctic Gazetteer
 List of Antarctic islands south of 60° S
 SCAR
 Territorial claims in Antarctica

Maps
 Isla Livingston: Península Hurd. Mapa topográfico de escala 1:25 000. Madrid: Servicio Geográfico del Ejército, 1991.
 L.L. Ivanov. Livingston Island: Central-Eastern Region. Scale 1:25000 topographic map.  Sofia: Antarctic Place-names Commission of Bulgaria, 1996.
 L.L. Ivanov et al. Antarctica: Livingston Island and Greenwich Island, South Shetland Islands. Scale 1:100000 topographic map. Sofia: Antarctic Place-names Commission of Bulgaria, 2005.
 L.L. Ivanov. Antarctica: Livingston Island and Greenwich, Robert, Snow and Smith Islands. Scale 1:120000 topographic map.  Troyan: Manfred Wörner Foundation, 2009.

References

External links
Composite Antarctic Gazetteer.

Rock formations of Livingston Island